Edward Henry Rennie (19 August 1852 – 8 January 1927) was an Australian scientist and a president of the Royal Society of South Australia.

Early life
Rennie was born in Balmain, Sydney, the eldest son of Edward Alexander Rennie (who later became auditor-general). E.H. Rennie was educated at the Fort Street public school, Sydney Grammar School, and the University of Sydney where he graduated B.A. (1870) and M.A. (1876); there he was influenced by Archibald Liversidge. He was a master at Sydney Grammar School for five years and at Brisbane Grammar School for about 18 months. He then went to London to study chemistry.

Scientific career 

Rennie was assistant to Dr C. R. Alder Wright in the chemical department of St Mary's hospital medical school for two years, did some teaching at the Royal College of Science, South Kensington, and graduated D.Sc. Lond. in 1881. Returning to Australia in 1882 he was two years in the government analyst's department at Sydney, and was then appointed first Angas Professor of Chemistry at the University of Adelaide. He began his duties in February 1885, and for many years had to work in makeshift conditions. Rennie however, made the best of the position, and also gave much time to the conduct of the university. He was a member of the council from 1889 to 1898, when he resigned because he was leaving Australia for 12 months to study the development of chemical manufacture, and was again a member of the council from 1909 to the time of his death. During 1924-5 and 1925-6 he was acting vice-chancellor. He was also an active member of the council of the school of mines. For 36 years he was a member of the council of the Royal Society of South Australia (president from 1886 to 1889 and 1900 to 1903, and vice-president from 1903 to 1919). He was for a time president of the Australian Chemical Institute, and chairman of the state committee of the Commonwealth advisory council of science and industry. In August 1926 he was elected to one of the highest offices open to a scientific man in Australia: that of president of the Australasian Association for the Advancement of Science. Rennie was also a fellow of the Chemical Societies of London and Berlin, and a fellow of the Institute of Chemists of Great Britain and Ireland. Rennie's legacy is evident with the Rennie Memorial Medal, issued annually by the RACI for outstanding research by an early career chemistry researcher.

Late life
Though in his seventy-fifth year Rennie was still carrying on the duties of his chair, when he died suddenly at Adelaide on 8 January 1927. He married a daughter of Dr Cadell of Sydney, who survived him with a son, E. J. C. Rennie (later a senior lecturer in engineering at the University of Melbourne) and two daughters.

References

1852 births
1927 deaths
Australian chemists
Academic staff of the University of Adelaide